Piz Rondadura is a mountain in the Lepontine Alps in Switzerland, located on the border between the cantons of Graubünden and Ticino. It overlooks Lukmanier Pass and Lake Sontga Maria on its east side.

References

External links
Piz Rondadura on Hikr

Mountains of Graubünden
Mountains of Ticino
Mountains of the Alps
Alpine three-thousanders
Graubünden–Ticino border
Lepontine Alps
Mountains of Switzerland